Eemster is a hamlet in the Dutch province of Drenthe. It is a part of the municipality of Westerveld, and lies about 16 km north of Hoogeveen.

The hamlet was first mentioned in 1210 as Hemsere. The etymology is unclear. Eemster was home to 179 people in 1840.

References

Populated places in Drenthe
Westerveld